Edward Dunphy may refer to:
 Edward Arthur Dunphy (1907–1989), Australian barrister and judge
 Edward J. Dunphy (1856–1926), American politician